The contingent vote is an electoral system used to elect a single representative in which a candidate requires a majority of votes to win. It is a variation of instant-runoff voting (IRV). Under the contingent vote, the voter ranks the candidates in order of preference, and the first preference votes are counted. If no candidate has a majority (more than half the votes cast), then all but the two leading candidates are eliminated and the votes received by the eliminated candidates are distributed among the two remaining candidates according to voters' preferences. This ensures that one candidate achieves a majority and is declared elected.

The contingent vote differs from IRV which allows for many rounds of counting, eliminating only one weakest candidate each round. IRV allows a small chance the candidate outside the top two can still win.
The contingent vote can also be considered a compressed form of the two-round system (runoff system), in which both 'rounds' occur without the need for voters to go to the polls twice.

Today, a special variant of the contingent vote is used to elect the President of Sri Lanka. Another variant, called the supplementary vote, is used to pick directly elected mayors and police and crime commissioners in England. In the past the ordinary form of the contingent vote was used to elect the Legislative Assembly of Queensland from 1892 to 1942. To date, this has been the longest continuous use of the system anywhere in the world. It was also used in the US state of Alabama in the 1920s.

Voting and counting

In an election held using the contingent vote the voters rank the list of candidates in order of preference. Under the most common ballot layout, they place a '1' beside their most preferred candidate, a '2' beside their second most preferred, and so on. In this respect the contingent vote is the same as instant-runoff voting.

There are then a maximum of two rounds of counting. In the first round only first preferences are counted. Candidates receiving an absolute majority of first preferences (i.e. more than half) are immediately declared the winner. However, if no candidate has an absolute majority then all but the two candidates with the most first preferences are eliminated, and there is a second round. In the second round the votes of the voters whose first preference had been eliminated are transferred to whichever of the two remaining candidates were ranked the highest. The votes are then counted and whichever candidate has an absolute majority is declared elected.

Impact on factions and candidates
Like Instant runoff voting, the two round system, the goal of the contingent vote is to enable a majority of voters to confirm the winner of an election. The majority requirement encourages candidates to seek support beyond their core base of supporters in order to secure the lower preferences of the supporters of other candidates. This is said to create a more conciliatory campaigning style among candidates with similar policy platforms. However this effect will be diminished by the fact that lower preferences are less important under the contingent vote than under IRV; under the contingent vote it is especially important for candidates to receive many first preferences so that they are not eliminated straight away.

Compared to plurality voting, the contingent vote does aid the chances of 'third party' candidates to some extent, as voters do not need to be afraid a vote for a third party will spoil the election for a stronger party candidate, as long as their second preference candidate can make the top-two requirement.

Variants 

The Supplementary Vote and Sri Lankan contingent vote are two implemented variations in which voters, differently from the ordinary form of the contingent vote, cannot rank all of the candidates, but rather are only permitted to express two and three ranks of preferences, respectively.

This means that if a voter does not use any of his or her preferences to support one of the candidates who survives to the second round, then it will be impossible to transfer that vote, which is therefore 'wasted' or 'exhausted'.

Sri Lankan contingent vote 

In Sri Lanka, since the 1982 presidential election, a variant of the contingent vote electoral system is used to elect the president. As under the conventional contingent vote, in an election held using the Sri Lankan form of the contingent vote each voter ranks the candidates in order of preference, and if no candidate receives an overall majority of first preference votes on the first count then all but the two leading candidates are eliminated and their votes redistributed to help determine a winner in a second and final round. However, whereas under the ordinary form of the contingent vote voters can rank all of the candidates in order of preference, under Sri Lankan CV the voter only expresses his or her top three preferences.

Similar systems

Two-round system

Under the two-round system (also known as runoff voting and the second ballot) voters vote for only a single candidate, rather than ranking candidates in order of preference. As under the contingent vote, if no candidate has an absolute majority in the first round, all but the top two are eliminated and there is a second round. However, in the two round system, voters are asked to return and vote a second time. Because of the similarities between them, the contingent vote and the two-round system can usually be expected to elect the same winner. However, in the two-round system, the voter is permitted to change one's mind from one round to another, even if the favourite candidate in the first round has not been eliminated.

Nonpartisan blanket primary 

The nonpartisan blanket primary is a variation of the two-round system except the first round does not pick a winner, but instead picks the two highest candidates who will compete in the general election. Because the first round does not pick a winner, there will tend to be higher voter turnout in the second election.

The contingent vote will generally pick the same winner as a blanket primary, except fewer voters in the primary round may lead to a different top-two candidates than if the whole electorate voted in both rounds.

Top-four primary 
The top-four primary is a variant of the nonpartisan blanket primary which advances the top four candidates from a single primary, regardless of party, and uses Instant-runoff voting in the general election to pick a majority winner.

Instant-runoff voting 
As noted above, the instant-runoff voting (or alternative vote) differs from the contingent vote in that it permits several rounds rather than just two. Under the alternative vote only candidate(s) for whom it is mathematically impossible to win are eliminated after each round, and as many rounds occur as are necessary to give one candidate an absolute majority. These differences mean that the contingent vote and alternative vote can produce different results. Because, under the contingent vote, all but two candidates are eliminated in the first round, it is possible for a candidate to be eliminated who would have gone on to win had they been allowed to receive transfers in later rounds.

See also
Ranked voting systems
History and use of instant-runoff voting
Tactical manipulation of runoff voting
Elected mayors in the United Kingdom
List of democracy and elections-related topics
Alternative vote
Alternative Vote Plus
Single transferable vote

References

See Electoral Reform Society press release on Torbay election
Colin Rallings, Michael Thrasher and David Cowling (2002), 'Mayoral Referendums and Elections', Local Government Studies 28 (4), pp67–90.

External links
Democratic and Electoral Shifts in Queensland (PDF)
London Elects: How the Mayor of London is Elected
Electoral Systems Index: Sri Lanka

 
Single-winner electoral systems
Preferential electoral systems
Non-monotonic electoral systems